John Francis "Mick" Cotter  (born 21 March 1935) is an Australian retired politician. Born in Yarram, Victoria, he was a pastoralist, miner, prospector and contractor before entering politics. Having moved to Western Australia, he was elected to Coolgardie Shire Council in 1965. In 1974 he left the council to run as the Liberal candidate for the Australian House of Representatives seat of Kalgoorlie, losing to long-serving Labor member Fred Collard. He sought a rematch against Collard in 1975, this time winning. He held the seat until his defeat in 1980.

References

Liberal Party of Australia members of the Parliament of Australia
Members of the Australian House of Representatives for Kalgoorlie
Members of the Australian House of Representatives
Recipients of the Medal of the Order of Australia
1935 births
Living people
20th-century Australian politicians